Continental Glacier is in Bridger-Teton and Shoshone National Forests, in the U.S. state of Wyoming and straddles the Continental Divide in the northern Wind River Range. Continental Glacier is in both the Bridger and Fitzpatrick Wildernesses, and is part of the largest grouping of glaciers in the American Rocky Mountains. Immediately east of Continental Glacier lies East Torrey Glacier.

References

See also
 List of glaciers in the United States

Glaciers of Fremont County, Wyoming
Great Divide of North America
Glaciers of Sublette County, Wyoming
Shoshone National Forest
Glaciers of Wyoming